Revista Hispánica Moderna is a peer-reviewed academic journal which focuses on research in Hispanic and Luso-Brazilian literature and culture. It was founded in 1934 as Boletín del Instituto de las Españas at Columbia University. The current editor is Graciela Montaldo, a professor in the Department of Latin American and Iberian Cultures at Columbia University. The journal is published semiannually by the University of Pennsylvania Press. It is available online through Project MUSE and JSTOR.

In 2009, the Council of Editors of Learned Journals awarded the Revista Hispánica Moderna the 2009 Phoenix Award for Significant Editorial Achievement.

References

External links 
 
 RHM on Project MUSE
 RHM on JSTOR

Cultural journals
University of Pennsylvania Press academic journals